Seonjo of Joseon (26 November 1552 – 16 March 1608) was the fourteenth king of the Joseon dynasty of Korea from 1567 to 1608. He was known for encouraging Confucianism and renovating state affairs at the beginning of his reign. However, he later gained infamy from political discord and incompetent leadership during the Japanese invasions of Korea

Biography

Background
King Seonjo was born Yi Yeon in 1552 in Hanseong (today, Seoul), capital of Korea, as the third son of Prince Deokheung (덕흥군), himself son of King Jungjong and Royal Noble Consort Chang of the Ansan Ahn clan (창빈 안씨). On his mother's side, Yi Yeon was also a great-great-great-grandson of Princess Jeongui, the daughter of Queen Soheon and King Sejong. Princess Jeongui's granddaughter, Lady Ahn of the Juksan Ahn clan, married Jeong Sang-jo (정상조, 鄭尙祖), his great-grandfather and son of Jeong In-ji through his second wife, Lady Yi of the Gyeongju Yi clan. As well as Jeong Sang-jo being the younger half-brother of Jo Gwang-jo.

He was given the title of Prince Haseong, and was eventually adopted by Queen Insun. When King Myeongjong died young without an heir, Prince Haseong was the next in the line of succession. Then, by decision of the royal court, he was crowned king in 1567 at the age of 16. His father had the status of Grand Internal Prince (대원군, Daewongun, 'Great Prince of the Court).

Early Reign (1567–1575)
King Seonjo focused on the improvement of the lives of the common people, as well as rebuilding the nation after the political corruption during the chaotic reign of Yeonsangun and King Jungjong. He encouraged Sarim scholars, who had been persecuted by entrenched aristocrats in four different purges between 1498 and 1545 during reign of Yeonsangun and Jungjong. Seonjo continued the political reforms of King Myeongjong, and put many famous Confucian scholars, including Yi Hwang, Yi I, Jeong Cheol, and Yu Seong-ryong, in office.

Seonjo also reformed the civil service examination system, particularly the civil official qualification exam. The previous exam was mainly concerned with literature, not with politics or history. The king himself ordered the system to be reformed by increasing the importance of these other subjects. He also restored the reputations of executed scholars such as Jo Gwang-jo, who died in Third Literati Purge of 1519, and denounced the accomplishments of corrupt aristocrats, notably Nam Gon, who instigated the purge under Jungjong and contributed greatly to the corruption of the era. These acts earned the king the respect of the general populace, and the country enjoyed a brief era of peace.

Political division and East-West feud (1575–1592)

Among the scholars King Seonjo called to the government were Sim Ui-gyeom and Kim Hyowon. Sim was a relative of the queen and heavily conservative. Kim was the leading figure of the new generation of officials and called for liberal reforms. The scholars who supported King Seonjo began to split into two factions, headed by Sim and Kim. Members of the two factions even lived in the same neighborhood; Sim's faction lived on west side of the city while Kim's followers gathered on the east side. Consequently, the two factions began to be called the Western Faction and the Easterners ; this two-faction based political system lasted 200 years and later helped bring about the collapse of the Joseon dynasty.

At first the Westerners earned the favor of the king, since Sim was related to the queen and also had larger support from wealthy nobles. However, their attitudes on reformation and Sim's indecisiveness helped the Easterners take power, and the Westerners fell out of favor. Reforms were accelerated during the first period of influence of the Easterners, but then many Easterners began to urge others to slow down the reforms. The Easterners were once again divided into the Northern and the Southern Faction. Yu Seong-ryong led the Southern faction while the Northerners divided even further after arguments over many issues; the greater Northern faction came to become extremely liberal in the scope of their reform goals, while the “lesser” Northern faction was less reformist but still more open to reform than the Southerners.

The political divisions caused the nation to be weakened, since the size of the military was also one of the issues on the reform agenda. Yi I, a neutral conservative, urged the king to increase the size of the army to prepare against future invasions from the Jurchens and Japanese. However, both factions rejected Yi's suggestions, and the size of the army was decreased further since many believed the peaceful period would last. The Jurchens and Japanese used this opportunity to expand their influence in East Asia, resulting in the Seven-Year War, and the foundation of the Qing dynasty in China, both of which would lead to devastation on the Korean Peninsula.
 
King Seonjo faced many difficulties dealing with both new threats, sending many skilled military commanders to the northern front, while contending with Japanese leaders Oda Nobunaga, Toyotomi Hideyoshi and Tokugawa Ieyasu in the south. However, after Toyotomi Hideyoshi unified Japan, the Japanese soon proved themselves to be the greater threat; and many Koreans began to fear that their country would be taken over by the Japanese. Many officials concerned with the defense of the kingdom urged the king to send delegates to Hideyoshi, their major purpose being to find out whether Hideyoshi was preparing for invasion or not. However, the two government factions could not even agree on this issue of national importance; so a compromise was made and one delegate from each faction was sent to Hideyoshi. When they returned to Korea, their reports only caused more controversy and confusion. Hwang Yun-gil, of the Westerners faction, reported that Hideyoshi was raising huge numbers of troops, but Kim Seong-il, of the Easterners faction, told the king that he thought these large forces were not for the war against Korea, since he was trying to complete his reforms quickly to prevent lawlessness and quash the bandits now roaming the countryside. Since the Easterners had the bigger voice in government at the time, Hwang's reports were ignored and Seonjo decided not to prepare for war, even though the attitude of Hideyoshi in his letter to Seonjo clearly showed his interest in the conquest of Asia.

Six-Year War (1592–1598)

In 1591, after the delegates had returned from Japan, Toyotomi Hideyoshi sent his own delegates to visit King Seonjo, and asked permission to pass through the Korean Peninsula to invade China, in effect declaring war against the Joseon kingdom. The king was surprised; after refusing the Japanese request he sent a letter to Beijing to alert the Chinese that the Japanese were actually preparing for full-scale war against the Korean-Chinese alliance. He also ordered the construction of many forts in the coastal regions and sent generals Sin Rip and Yi Il to the southern coast to prepare for war. While the Koreans were busy making their preparations, the Japanese manufactured muskets for many of their soldiers, mobilized warriors from across the entire country.

On April 13, 1592, about 700 Japanese ships under Konishi Yukinaga invaded Korea. Konishi easily burned Fort Busan and Fort Donglae, killed commanders Jeong Bal and Song Sang-hyeon and marched northward. On the next day even more troops under Katō Kiyomasa and Kuroda Nagamasa landed, also marching toward Hanyang. A huge Japanese fleet under Todo Takatora and Kuki Yoshitaka supported them from the sea. General Yi Il faced Katō Kiyomasa at the Battle of Sangju, which was won by Japanese. Then Yi Il met General Sin Rip, but their combined forces were also defeated at the Battle of Chungju by Konishi Yukinaga. Then Seonjo appointed General Kim Myeong-won as Commander-in-Chief and Field Marshal, and ordered him to defend the capital. Then the king moved to Pyongyang, since the Japanese began to seize the capital. He later moved even further north to the border city of Uiju just before the fall of Pyongyang. While the king was absent from the capital, many people who had lost hope in the government plundered the palace and burned many public buildings. This resulted in even more damage than that perpetrated by the Japanese after they had captured the city.

Although the army continued to lose men and battles, the navy successfully cut the Japanese supply line from the sea; Admiral Yi Sun-sin defeated the Japanese fleet several times and did much damage to the supply ships. With the navy blocking supplies, Chinese forces arrived and began to push the Japanese southward, eventually retaking Pyongyang. Konishi Yukinaga successfully blocked a Chinese advance at Battle of Byeokjegwan, and again tried to push the Koreans northward, but the crucial blow came at the Battle of Hangju, where General Gwon Yul defeated the Japanese with a much smaller force. The Japanese then decided to enter into peace negotiations, while both sides continued fighting. During these negotiations Koreans retook Seoul, but the palaces had all been burnt to the ground, so Seonjo repaired one of the old royal family's houses and renamed it Deoksugung, making it one of the official palaces.

The peace negotiations between the Chinese and Japanese ended unsuccessfully, due to a lack of understanding between the two sides and misrepresentation of the Koreans. The Japanese again invaded Korea in 1597; but this time all three nations were ready for war, and the Japanese were not able to advance as easily as in 1592. The Japanese tried to take Hanyang from both land and sea routes. At first the plan seemed to work well when Todo Takatora defeated Admiral Won Gyun at the Battle of Chilchonryang, but it was eventually thwarted when the Korean navy under Admiral Yi Sun-sin defeated the Japanese fleet under Todo Takatora in the Battle of Myeongnyang with only 13 ships. Combined with the sudden death of Toyotomi Hideyoshi, the battle effectively ended the war, with the Japanese completely withdrawing from Korea in 1598. The Battle of Noryang marked the end of the war, with the last Japanese units under Konishi Yukinaga leaving Korea.

Later days (1598–1608)
Despite all the efforts put in by Seonjo during the war, such as establishing army training facilities and reforming taxation laws – people were awarded with increase of social class, exemption of labor or crimes in return for payment of tax in rice – the war left a devastated land and starving people. After the war, his wish of reconstructing the nation was impeded by the political turmoil caused by quarrelling political factions and famine. King Seonjo lost hope in governing the nation, and let his Crown Prince Gwanghaegun rule in his place. However, when the queen gave birth to a son (Gwanghaegun was the second son of Lady Kim, the king's concubine), the succession also became a matter of contention. King Seonjo died in 1608, while political division and outside threats still darkened the skies over Korea.

Family

 Grandfather
 King Jungjong of Joseon (16 April 1488 – 29 November 1544) (조선 중종)
 Grandmother
 Royal Noble Consort Chang of the Ansan Ahn clan (2 September 1499 – 7 November 1549) (창빈 안씨)
 Father
Biological: Yi Cho, Grand Internal Prince Deokheung (2 April 1530 – 14 June 1559) (이초 덕흥대원군)
Adoptive: King Myeongjong (명종대왕) (3 July 1532 – 2 August 1567)
 Mother
Biological: Grand Internal Princess Consort Hadong of the Hadong Jeong clan (23 September 1522 – 24 June 1567) (하동부대부인 정씨)
Maternal Grandfather: Jeong Se-Ho (1486–1563) (정세호, 鄭世虎)
Maternal Grandmother: Lady Yi of the Gwangju Yi clan (광주 이씨)
Adoptive: Queen Insun of the Cheongsong Sim clan (인순왕후 심씨) (7 June 1532 – 12 February 1575)
Consorts and their Respective Issue(s):
 Queen Uiin of the Bannam Park clan (5 May 1555 – 5 August 1600) (의인왕후 박씨) — No issue.
 Queen Inmok of the Yeonan Kim clan (15 December 1584 – 13 August 1632) (인목왕후 김씨)
 Princess Jeongmyeong (27 June 1603 – 8 September 1685) (정명공주), Eleventh daughter
Fourteenth daughter (1604–1604)
 Yi Ui, Grand Prince Yeongchang (12 April 1606 – 19 March 1614) (이의 영창대군), Thirteenth son
 Royal Noble Consort Gong of the Gimhae Kim clan (16 November 1553 – 13 June 1577) (공빈 김씨)
 Yi Jin, Prince Imhae (20 September 1572 – 3 June 1609) (이진 임해군), First son
 Yi Hon, Crown Prince Gwanghae (4 June 1575 – 7 August 1641) (이혼 광해세자), Second son
 Royal Noble Consort In of the Suwon Kim clan (1555–1613) (인빈 김씨)
 Yi Seong, Prince Uian (1577 – 24 February 1588) (이성 의안군), Third son
 Yi Ho, Prince Shinseong (6 January 1579 – 8 December 1592) (이후 신성군), Fourth son
 Yi Bu, Prince Jeongwon (2 August 1580 – 29 December 1619) (이부 정원군), Fifth son
 Princess Jeongsin (1583–1653) (정신옹주), First daughter
 Princess Jeonghye (1584–1638) (정혜옹주), Second daughter
 Princess Jeongsuk (1587 – 6 November 1627) (정숙옹주), Third daughter
 Yi Gwang, Prince Uichang (1589–1645) (이광 의창군), Eighth son
 Princess Jeongan (1590–1660) (정안옹주), Fifth daughter
 Princess Jeonghwi (1593 – 15 July 1653) (정휘옹주), Sixth daughter
 Royal Noble Consort Sun of the Gimhae Kim clan (순빈 김씨) (? – 1647)
 Yi Bu, Prince Sunhwa (10 October 1580 – 18 March 1607) (이부 순화군), Sixth son
 Royal Noble Consort Jeong of the Yeoheung Min clan (1567–1626) (정빈 민씨)
 Yi Gong, Prince Inseong (29 October 1588 – 20 May 1628) (이공 인성군), Seventh son
 Princess Jeongin  (1590 – 10 January 1656) (정인옹주), Fourth daughter
 Princess Jeongseon (1 April 1594 – 1 August 1614) (정선옹주), Seventh daughter
 Princess Jeonggeun (1601 – 11 July 1613) (정근옹주), Tenth daughter
 Yi Yeong, Prince Inheung (1604–1651) (이영 인흥군), Twelfth son
 Royal Noble Consort Jeong of the Namyang Hong clan (1563–1638) (정빈 홍씨)
 Princess Jeongjeong (1595–1666) (정정옹주), Eighth daughter
 Yi Ju, Prince Gyeongchang (23 September 1596 – 16 January 1644) (이주 경창군), Ninth son
 Royal Noble Consort On of the Cheongju Han clan (2 November 1581 - 10 December 1664) (온빈 한씨)
 Yi Je, Prince Heungan (1598–1624) (이제 흥안군), Tenth son
 Yi Reuk, Prince Gyeongpyeong (June 1600 – 28 November 1673) (이륵 경평군), Eleventh son
 Princess Jeonghwa (1604–1667) (정화옹주), Twelfth  daughter
 Yi Gye, Prince Yeongseon (21 January 1607 – 24 October 1649) (이계 영선군), Fourteenth son
 Royal Consort Gwi-in of the Yeonil Jeong clan (귀인 정씨) (1557–1579)
 Royal Consort Suk-ui of the Dongrae Jeong clan (숙의 정씨) (1564–1580)
 Royal Consort Suk-ui of the Kim clan (숙의 김씨)
 Royal Consort Suk-ui of the Han clan (숙의 한씨)
 Deposed Royal Consort So-won of the Yun clan (폐 소원 윤씨) (? – 1632)
 Court Lady Kim (상궁 김씨) (? – 1623) 
 Court Lady Park (상궁 박씨)
 Unknown
 Fifteenth son (? – 1603)
 Ninth daughter (1596–1601)
 Thirteenth Daughter (? – 1603)

Modern depictions 
Portrayed by Kim Sung-ok in the 1995 KBS2 TV series West Palace.
Portrayed by Park Chan-hwan in the 1999–2000 MBC TV series Hur Jun.
Portrayed by Im Dong-jin in the 2003 SBS The King's Woman.
Portrayed by Choi Cheol-ho in the 2004–2005 KBS1 TV series Immortal Admiral Yi Sun-sin.
Portrayed by Kim Chang-wan in the 2010 film Blades of Blood.
Portrayed by Jeon No-min in the 2013 MBC TV series Hur Jun, The Original Story.
Portrayed by Jeong Bo-seok in the 2013 MBC TV series Goddess of Fire.
Portrayed by Lee Sung-jae in the 2014 KBS2 TV series The King's Face.
Portrayed by Kim Tae-woo in the 2015 KBS1 TV series The Jingbirok: A Memoir of Imjin War.
Portrayed by Park Yeong-gyu in the 2015 MBC TV series Splendid Politics.
Portrayed by Lee Ji-hoon in the 2016 JTBC TV series Mirror of the Witch.
Portrayed by Kim Hyun-bin in the 2016 MBC TV series Flowers of the Prison.
Portrayed by Jang Hyuk in the 2019 tvN TV Series The Crowned Clown.

See also
List of Koreans
Rulers of Korea

References

1552 births
1608 deaths
16th-century Korean monarchs
17th-century Korean monarchs
People from Seoul